The Central District of Tonekabon County is a district (bakhsh) in Tonekabon County, Mazandaran Province, Iran. At the 2006 census, its population was 85,739, in 25,304 families.  The District has two cities: Tonekabon & Shirud. The District has two rural districts (dehestan): Goli Jan Rural District and Mir Shams ol Din Rural District.

References 

Tonekabon County
Districts of Mazandaran Province